Thompsonville is a census-designated place (CDP) in the town of Enfield in Hartford County, Connecticut, United States. The population of the CDP was 8,577 at the 2010 census.

History
Thompsonville was established in the 19th century as a carpet-manufacturing community. Orrin Thompson, from whom the community takes its name, built a dam across Freshwater Brook in 1828 and opened the first carpet mill in 1829. Thompson's first mill, named "White Mill", employed skilled weavers brought from Scotland. Initially its product was largely flat-woven ingrain carpeting, an inexpensive type of carpeting, but over time it added more expensive weaves, such as three-ply ingrain and loop brussels. The mill had 230 looms in operation as of 1846.

Carpeting continued to be manufactured in Thompsonville until 1971, by which time most production had shifted to the southern United States.

Geography
Thompsonville is located on the east bank of the Connecticut River and is bounded by Interstate 91 to the east. U.S. Route 5 (Enfield Street) is the main road through the village, leading north to Longmeadow, Massachusetts, and into Springfield, and south through East and South Windsor to East Hartford. Connecticut Route 190 crosses Route 5, leading west across the Connecticut River into Suffield and east to Hazardville.

Demographics
At the 2000 census there were 8,125 people, 3,442 households, and 1,896 families living in the CDP. The racial makeup of the CDP was 90.01% White, 3.96% African American, 0.33% Native American, 1.61% Asian, 0.05% Pacific Islander, 1.50% from other races, and 2.54% from two or more races. Hispanic or Latino of any race were 4.70%.

Of the 3,442 households 29.5% had children under the age of 18 living with them, 33.3% were married couples living together, 17.0% had a female householder with no husband present, and 44.9% were non-families. 36.5% of households were one person and 11.5% were one person aged 65 or older.  The average household size was 2.28 and the average family size was 3.02.

The age distribution was 25.5% under the age of 18, 8.2% from 18 to 24, 34.0% from 25 to 44, 16.6% from 45 to 64, and 15.7% 65 or older.  The median age was 35 years. For every 100 females, there were 90.4 males.  For every 100 females age 18 and over, there were 86.6 males.

The median household income was $39,154 and the median family income  was $42,692. Males had a median income of $38,000 versus $29,550 for females. The per capita income for the CDP was $19,851.  About 7.3% of families and 9.2% of the population were below the poverty line, including 11.8% of those under age 18 and 12.0% of those age 65 or over.

References

Enfield, Connecticut
Census-designated places in Hartford County, Connecticut
Connecticut populated places on the Connecticut River
Neighborhoods in Connecticut
Census-designated places in Connecticut